A by-election was held for the New South Wales Legislative Assembly electorate of Concord on 11 February 1950 because of the death of Brice Mutton.

The by-elections for Armidale and Wollongong-Kembla were held on the same day.

Dates

Result

The by-election was caused by the death of Brice Mutton.

See also
Electoral results for the district of Concord
List of New South Wales state by-elections

References

1950 elections in Australia
New South Wales state by-elections
1950s in New South Wales